Nectandra canaliculata is a species of plant in the family Lauraceae. It is endemic to Ecuador.  Its natural habitat is subtropical or tropical moist lowland forests.

References

canaliculata
Endemic flora of Ecuador
Vulnerable flora of South America
Taxonomy articles created by Polbot